The Boundary Bay Brewing Company, also known as the Boundary Bay Brewery & Bistro is a brewery and brewpub in Bellingham, Washington, USA.

History 
The brewery was founded in by Ed Bennett. Bennet earned dual masters degrees in finance and wine chemistry and studied brewing at the University of California, Davis. In 1994, Bennet leased and remodeled an old transit company station building that was originally constructed in 1992. There, the brewery opened in 1995.

The brewery is named after Boundary Bay, a bay north of Bellingham that is partially Canadian and partially American territory. During prohibition, rum-runners and bootleggers crossed illegal alcohol into the States through this unique geological feature.

Awards & recognition 
In 2008, Boundary Bay Brewery was the nation's largest brewpub based on number of barrels sold according to The New Brewer, a publication of the Brewers Association. In 2015, Boundary Bay Brewery was the largest brewpub in Washington state and the 10th largest in the nation.

Boundary Bay Brewing Company has won numerous awards in national and international beer competitions.

See also
 Beer in the United States

References

External links
The Boundary Bay Brewery and Bistro official site

Companies based in Bellingham, Washington
Beer brewing companies based in Washington (state)
1995 establishments in Washington (state)
American beer brands